Odoo is a Belgian suite of business management software tools including, for example, CRM, e-commerce, billing, accounting, manufacturing, warehouse, project management, and inventory management.  

During Odoo experience which took place in Belgium in October 2022, Fabien Pinckaers announced that moving forward Odoo will make all applications available for free in enterprise edition, making Odoo an unparalleled suite of 70+ integrated business apps. 

The Community version is a libre software, licensed under the GNU LGPLv3. The Enterprise version has proprietary extra features and services. The source code for the framework and core ERP modules is curated by the Belgium-based Odoo S.A. Odoo is available for both on-premises and ready to use SaaS environment. The source code for the OpenObject framework and the core ERP modules are provided by Belgium-based Odoo S.A.

Overview
From inception, Odoo S.A (formerly OpenERP S.A) has released the core software as open source. Since the V9.0 release, the company has transitioned to an open core model, which provides subscription-based proprietary enterprise software and cloud-hosted software as a service, in addition to the open source version. In 2013, the not-for-profit Odoo Community Association was formed to promote the widespread use of Odoo and to support the collaborative development of Odoo features.

Odoo's extensible architecture allows a large number of freelancers and organizations to develop Odoo Apps or Modules and place them in the marketplace for sale or to be downloaded for free. The main Odoo components are the framework, about 30 core applications (also called official modules), and thousands of community modules.

Odoo has been used as a component of university courses. A study on experimental learning suggested that Odoo (then known as OpenERP) provides a suitable alternative to proprietary systems to supplement teaching.

Several books have been written about Odoo, some covering specific areas such as accounting or development.

Version support 
The last three Long Term Support versions (LTS) are supported in parallel. This means that when a new, fourth LTS version is released, the oldest version will reach the end of its useful life and will no longer be supported. As an example, 9.0 LTS is supported along with 10.0 LTS and 11.0 LTS, but it will reach End of Life when 12.0 LTS is released.

History 
In 2005, Fabien Pinckaers, the founder and current CEO of Odoo, started to develop his first software product, TinyERP. Three years later, the name was changed to OpenERP. The company started to grow quickly and in 2010, OpenERP had become a 100+ employee company. 

In 2013, the company won a Deloitte award for being the fastest-growing company in Belgium, with 1549% growth over a five-year period. 

In 2014, the company was renamed Odoo, to diversify itself from the term "ERP". In 2015, Inc. Magazine placed Odoo in the top 5000 fastest-growing private companies in Europe.

In 2019, the company raised a $90 million investment. 

In 2021, Odoo products were used by more than 5 million customers. Odoo expects to hire 1,000 new employees, according to CEO Fabien Pinckaers.

Reception
Odoo has received several recognitions; before its name change, it received awards as OpenERP including Trends Gazelle, Deloitte Technology Fast 50 Award and the InfoWorld's BOSSIE Award 2013. After changing its name to Odoo, it won consecutive BOSSIE Awards in 2014, 2015, and 2016.

See also

 Comparison of accounting software
 List of free and open source ERP packages
 List of free and open source software packages
 List of free and open source software packages concerning finance

References

External links
 Odoo

ERP software
Free customer relationship management software
Free ERP software
Enterprise resource planning software for Linux
Software companies of Belgium
Customer relationship management software companies
Software using the GNU AGPL license
Belgian brands
Companies based in Namur (province)